Chauraha  (Crossroads) is a 1994 Hindi-language action film, produced by Pradeep Shirodkar under the Revathi Films banner and directed by Sadaqat Hussain. It stars Jeetendra, Jaya Prada, Jackie Shroff, Ashwini Bhave in pivotal roles and music composed by Laxmikant Pyarelal.

Plot
Amar, a twelve-year-old orphan, works in a hotel, and at night, studies at Masterjis school. Kalinath, a pimp, murders one of his customers, and the innocent Amar is convicted instead of Kalinath. After many years, Amar returns, after completing his sentence and finds everything changed. The school had made way for a gambling-house. He learns that Kalinath is dead and his son Baba Bhatti is one of the leading criminals. Amar brings the crooks to book, and the gambling house now makes way for "Insaaf Ghar". Amar falls in love with Poonam, an honest Inspector Kailash Mathur's sister. Amar comes across a poster of Badrinath, who is contesting the elections. He identifies him instantly, he is the pimp Kalinath, Amar and his friends Kidnap Kalinath, alias Badrinath, two days before the elections.

Cast

 Jeetendra as Inspector Kailash Mathur 
 Jaya Prada as Mrs. Pooja Mathur
 Jackie Shroff as Amar 
 Ashwini Bhave as Poonam 
 Shakti Kapoor as Inspector Bankelal 
 Sadashiv Amrapurkar as Kalinath / Badrinath 
 Danny Denzongpa as Baba Bhatti
 Alok Nath as Masterji
 Avtar Gill as Tiwari 
 Vikas Anand as IGP
 Yunus Parvez as Ibrahim, hotel owner
 Javed Khan as Prem
 Bharat Kapoor as Police Commissioner
 Farha Naaz as Dancer  
Dilip Dhawan as Raman
 Sulabha Deshpande as Mrs. D'Souza
Shagufta Ali as Jerry, D'Souza daughter
 Shammi as Dai Maa
 Deep Dhillon as Girdhari 
 Dan Dhanoa as Snaky
 Mac Mohan as Mac
 Mehmood Jr. as goon under Girdhari

Soundtrack

External links

References

1994 films
1990s Hindi-language films
Films scored by Laxmikant–Pyarelal
Indian action films
1994 action films
Hindi-language action films